Paari (Bengali: পাড়ি) is a 1966 Bengali film directed by Jagganath Chatterjee, based on a story by Jarasandha. It stars Dharmendra in his first Bengali film and Pronoti Ghosh, with Dilip Kumar in a guest appearance as a jailor in Andaman and was successful. It was later remade in 1972 by the same director in Hindi as Anokha Milan with the lead actors reprising their roles. This was the first movie in which Dilip Kumar and Dharmendra appeared together.

Plot

Cast
 Dharmendra
 Pronoti Ghosh
 Dilip Kumar
 Abhi Bhattacharya
 Dilip Roy
 Keshto Mukherjee

Soundtrack
The soundtrack of Paari consists of three songs with music composed and lyrics written by Salil Chowdhury. The last song "tora sundor saami paabi" (you all will get handsome husbands) is a Bengali pre-marriage folk song and was given to Salil by Nirmalaendu Chowdhury (a famous Bengali folk singer). Salil Chowdhury changed a few words of the lyrics as required by the film.

The three songs were later reused in Hindi version, Anokha Milan, with Hindi lyrics for the first two songs, while the folk song "Toraa sundor saami paabi" remained the same. The tune of "Bokul boner katha" was also used in a 1975 Malayalam film Raagam, with music by Salil Chowdhury, in the song "Naadanpaattile Maina".

References

External links
 

Bengali film scores by Salil Chowdhury
Bengali-language Indian films
Films based on Indian novels
1960s Bengali-language films